Charles Edward Dagnall (born 10 July 1976), also known as Charlie Dagnall, is a cricket commentator and former first-class cricketer who played as a right-arm fast-medium bowler for Cumberland, Warwickshire and Leicestershire. 

He has worked as a commentator and pundit for BBC Radio Leicester, in addition to having his own drive time show. He has also commentated on T20, One Day Internationals and Test matches (on Test Match Special). In 2013 he was co-host of NFL UK's Inside the Huddle podcast. He has now become a commentator for BT Sport cricket. and Sky Sports.

References

1976 births
Living people
English cricketers
Cumberland cricketers
Leicestershire cricketers
Warwickshire cricketers
English cricket commentators